Desmia extrema is a moth in the family Crambidae. It was described by Francis Walker in 1856. It is found in Brazil.

References

Moths described in 1856
Desmia
Moths of South America